The Greatest Songs of the Seventies is Barry Manilow's follow up to his previous album, The Greatest Songs of the Sixties. The album was released on September 18, 2007. The album was released under Arista Records and it features some of Manilow's hits in acoustic.

The Greatest Songs of the Seventies debuted at number four on the U.S. Billboard 200 chart, selling about 113,000 copies in its first week.

Album producer Clive Davis said about Manilow, "No one can reinvent the great classics better than Barry Manilow. He breathes new life and vitality into these truly wonderful songs and they sound fresh and timeless. We continue on the mission to bring to a new generation the great songs of a different era." Davis has worked with Manilow since the 1970s and had been good friends.

Track listing

"The Way We Were" (Barbra Streisand cover, 1974)
"My Eyes Adored You" (The Four Seasons cover, 1975)
"Bridge Over Troubled Water" (Simon & Garfunkel cover, 1970)
"How Can You Mend A Broken Heart?" (Bee Gees cover, 1971)
"It Never Rains in Southern California" (Albert Hammond cover, 1972)
"You've Got a Friend" (Duet with Melissa Manchester) (James Taylor cover, 1971)
"He Ain't Heavy, He's My Brother" (The Hollies cover, 1969)
"Sailing" (Christopher Cross cover, 1979)
"The Long and Winding Road" (The Beatles cover, 1970)
"(They Long to Be) Close to You" (The Carpenters cover, 1970)
"If" (Bread cover, 1971)
"Sorry Seems To Be The Hardest Word" (Elton John cover, 1976)
"Mandy" (Acoustic), 1974
"Weekend in New England" (Acoustic), 1977
"Copacabana (At The Copa)" (Acoustic), 1978
"Even Now" (Acoustic), 1978
"Looks Like We Made It" (Acoustic), 1977
"I Write the Songs" (Acoustic), 1975

Tracks 13-18 had all originally been recorded by Barry Manilow himself in their respective years.

References

2007 albums
Barry Manilow albums
Albums produced by Clive Davis
Covers albums
Arista Records albums